Sisavath Keobounphanh (Lao: ສີສະຫວາດ ແກ້ວບຸນພັນ; 1 May 1928 – 12 May 2020) was Vice President of Laos from 1996 to 1998 and third Chairman of the Council of Ministers (Prime Minister) of Laos from 1998 to 2000. He was succeeded by Bounnhang Vorachith. He was a member of the Lao People's Revolutionary Party and was President of the Lao Front for National Construction from 2001 to 2011, when he was succeeded by Phandoungchit Vongsa.

References

External links 
World Statesmen

1928 births
2020 deaths
Members of the 1st Central Committee of the Lao People's Party
Members of the 2nd Central Committee of the Lao People's Revolutionary Party
Members of the 3rd Central Committee of the Lao People's Revolutionary Party
Members of the 4th Central Committee of the Lao People's Revolutionary Party
Members of the 5th Central Committee of the Lao People's Revolutionary Party
Members of the 6th Central Committee of the Lao People's Revolutionary Party
Members of the 7th Central Committee of the Lao People's Revolutionary Party
Members of the 8th Central Committee of the Lao People's Revolutionary Party
Members of the 4th Politburo of the Lao People's Revolutionary Party
Members of the 6th Politburo of the Lao People's Revolutionary Party
Members of the 7th Politburo of the Lao People's Revolutionary Party
Members of the 8th Politburo of the Lao People's Revolutionary Party
Members of the 2nd Secretariat of the Lao People's Revolutionary Party
Members of the 3rd Secretariat of the Lao People's Revolutionary Party
Members of the 4th Secretariat of the Lao People's Revolutionary Party
Lao People's Revolutionary Party politicians
Vice presidents of Laos
Prime Ministers of Laos
People from Houaphanh province
Laotian military leaders